Jakub Zbořil (born 21 February 1997) is a Czech professional ice hockey defenceman currently playing for the Boston Bruins of the National Hockey League (NHL). He was selected by the Bruins in the first round, 13th overall, at the 2015 NHL Entry Draft.

Playing career
Zbořil was drafted by the Saint John Sea Dogs in the first round, fifth overall, of the 2014 CHL Import Draft. His outstanding play with the Sea Dogs during the 2014–15 season was recognized when he was named to the 2014–15 QMJHL All-Rookie Team.

Leading up to the 2015 NHL Entry Draft on 26 June 2015, Zbořil was named as a top-rated prospect and was widely projected to be a first round selection at the draft. He was ultimately selected by the Boston Bruins with the 13th overall pick, acquired from the Los Angeles Kings in exchange for Milan Lucic, one of three consecutive first-round selections by the Bruins, along with Jake DeBrusk (14th overall) and Zachary Senyshyn (15th overall). On 15 July, Zbořil signed a three-year, entry-level contract with the Bruins. It would not be until the 2018–19 season, with a depleted defensive corps at the time, that Zboril would play his first NHL game with the Bruins – Zboril's first game with the Bruins occurred on 17 November 2018, in a 1–0 overtime road loss to the Dallas Stars. However, he only appeared in two games for the Bruins that year before returning to the minors.

On 8 September 2020, with the North American season to be delayed, Zbořil was loaned by the Bruins to join Czech Extraliga club, HC Kometa Brno, to begin the 2020–21 season until the commencement of the Bruins training camp. While on loan with Brno, Zbořil as a restricted free agent with the Bruins, was signed to a two-year, $1.45 million extension on 14 October 2020. He appeared in his third game with the Bruins in the delayed season opener on January 14, 2021 against the New Jersey Devils.

Career statistics

Regular season and playoffs

International

Awards and honours

References

External links

1997 births
Living people
Boston Bruins draft picks
Boston Bruins players
Czech ice hockey defencemen
HC Kometa Brno players
National Hockey League first-round draft picks
Providence Bruins players
Saint John Sea Dogs players
Ice hockey people from Brno
Czech expatriate ice hockey players in Canada
Czech expatriate ice hockey players in the United States